Aarklash Legacy is a  tactical role-playing video game developed by Cyanide and published by Bigben Interactive. It was released in 2013 for Microsoft Windows. Inspired by the Confrontation figurines universe, the game sees the player control 4 characters from a cast of 8 to form their party.

Reception 

Aarklash Legacy received "mixed or average" reviews, according to Metacritic with a score of 72 from critics and 7.7 for users as of October 2019. Some critics commented on the limited plot notably with Hooked Games stating "Story-telling and depth are lacking.", Gamer.no stating "It's a game with combat and little else.", and PC PowerPlay finding it "Devoid of plot".

References

External links
Official website

2013 video games
Cyanide (company) games
Video games developed in France
Windows games
Windows-only games
Tactical role-playing video games
Single-player video games